Ayesha Shahriyar Mohammed Al-Balooshi (born ) is an Emirati weightlifter, competing in the 58 kg category and representing United Arab Emirates at international competitions.

She competed at world championships, most recently at the 2014 World Weightlifting Championships. She placed 16th in the women's 58 kg event at the 2016 Summer Olympics.  She won the silver medal at the 2011 Pan Arab Games but was caught using performance-enhancing drugs and was stripped of her medal.

Major results

References

External links
http://www.thenational.ae/sport/olympics/uae-at-rio-2016-weightlifter-aisha-al-balooshi-at-start-of-a-journey-in-olympics
http://www.emirates247.com/sports/emirati-weightlifter-aisha-al-balushi-qualifies-for-rio-olympics-2016-06-30-1.634574
http://sport360.com/article/olympics/188641/ayesha-al-balushi-bows-out-on-high-after-achieving-personal-best-at-rio-2016/
http://sport360.com/article/other/more-sports/184708/interview-aisha-al-balushi-out-to-upset-the-apple-cart-at-rio-olympic-games-after-dream-qualification/
https://web.archive.org/web/20170821002402/https://vision.ae/sport/all/rio-2016-aisha-al-balooshi-ready-for-lift-off
http://stepfeed.com/uae-s-amna-al-haddad-has-lifted-a-nation-3000

1992 births
Living people
Emirati female weightlifters
Place of birth missing (living people)
Weightlifters at the 2016 Summer Olympics
Olympic weightlifters of the United Arab Emirates
Doping cases in weightlifting
21st-century Emirati women